Djinang is an Australian Aboriginal language, one of  the family of Yolŋu languages which are spoken in the north-east Arnhem Land region of the Northern Territory.

Dialects of the two moieties are:
 Yirritjing – Wurlaki, Djardiwitjibi, Mildjingi, Balmbi, and
Djuwing – Marrangu, Murrungun, Manyarring.

Wurlaki is included in a language revival project, as one of many critically endangered languages.

Introduction

History
Djinang is a language found in the Northern Territory of Australia in Arnhem Land.  Djinang is a part of the Yolngu language family—consisting of 11 other languages.  It is a part of the much larger Pama-Nyungan language family—285 languages (Lewis, Simons, Fennig 2013).  Mark Harvey (2011) writes "Pama-Nyungan is a genetic grouping, which occupies ca. 90% of the continent".  Djinang has several dialects: Manyarring, Marrangu, Murrungun, Balmbi, Djaḏiwitjibi, Mildjingi, and Wuḻaki (Wurlaki) (Waters 1983), but has only one sister language, which is the endangered language of Djinba, spoken by 45 people (Lewis, Simons, Fennig 2013).

Population
The people are simply called the Djinang.  Based on the 2006 census their population is 220 people (Lewis, Simons, Fennig 2013).  The Djinang are genetically linked with 90% of Australia, which points to a common ancestor from the distant past (Harvey 2011).  Multilingualism is highly prevalent, not just with the Djinang, but throughout all of Australia.  It came as a necessity for very specific reasons.  First, when visiting a clan that has a different language, it is proper etiquette to speak in the host's language.  Not only is it polite, but more importantly to the Aboriginal people, it appeases the ancient ancestors of the host clan (Harvey 2011).  Likewise, children usually have a father from one clan and a mother from another clan.  While the father's language would be the child's primary language, the child would learn the mother's language and would speak to her in her own language (Harvey 2011).

The Djinang, and indeed all Aboriginal people, even though they are multilingual, but keep their primary language in a place of great importance. One reason for this is that their language is directly connected to their land (Harvey 2011). While the Djinang have no definite boundaries to their lands, they and the clans of surrounding areas know which sites belong to a language. It is because of this "land–language" dependency that Australian languages are largely contained in a particular region.

Sounds
The Djinang language is based on a set of 24 phonemes, of which only three of those phonemes are vowels; giving Djinang a high consonant-vowel ratio of seven (Maddieson 2013). This differs from most Pacific languages as they tend to favor larger vowel variation along with a modest set of consonants.  Thus most Pacific languages customarily have average to low consonant-vowel ratios.

Consonants
Djinang has 21 consonants. In Djinang orthography, they are /p, t, ṯ, tj, k, b, d, ḏ, dj, g, m n, ṉ, ny, ŋ, l, ḻ, w, rr, r, y/. The underlined letters are retroflex (Waters 1979).  All languages in Australia share similar sound systems characteristic of few fricatives and sibilants, and the only allophones, are allophones of plosives.  For example, the phonemes /b/, /d/, and /g/ could be sounded as /p/, /t/, and /k/ in certain Aboriginal languages (Capell 1979).  However, in Djinang there is a clear contrast between those phonemes along with the phonemes of tj/dj (Waters 1979).

Vowels
Of Djinang's 24 phoneme set, only three are vowels, /a/, /i/, and /u/.  In addition to the low vowel count, or because of it, there are also no instances of diphthongs or triphthongs.  Moreover, there is no distinction of vowel length; however, there are instances of vowel lengthening when certain conditions are met, but they do not warrant a unique designation (Waters 1979).

Syllable structure 
The syllable structure of the Djinang language would be classified as moderately complex (Maddieson 2013).  It has three underlying syllable patterns CV, CVC, and CVCC (Waters 1979).  Because of Djinang's syllable patterns there are very few words that actually start with vowels or with consonant clusters e.g. str in straight (Koch 2007).

Grammar

Basic word order
Djinang is classified as a suffixing language and, therefore, has a flexible typology, in other words it does not rely on word order to convey meaning.  In regards to nouns Djinang depends on case (Nominative, Genitive, Ablative etc.) to show its function (Koch 2007).  When speaking of verbs Djinang relies heavily on suffixes to imply tense, mood, and aspect.  With that being said, Djinang and, indeed most Australian languages, have a tendency to follow a subject, object, verb (S.O.V.) typology (Koch 2007).  An example of flexible typology can be found in the Latin language (Shelmerdine 2013).

{|
| 
|style="vertical-align:top;"| -or-
| 
|}

While the word order for (2) reads just as it is translated, (1) would be the preferred order in Latin texts (Shelmerdine 2013).

Verbs
In Djinang verbs are extremely important in conveying the bulk of an utterance.  Verbs are so prominent that pronouns and certain nouns would only be implied; ex: 

(Waters 1979).  There are three major sets of verbs: classes I, II, III; within each class there are smaller groups separated by stem ending e.g. -i, -rr, -ji.  Each verb is sorted by the suffix it uses to signal tenses specific to Djinang: non-past, future, yesterday-past, imperative, today-past, today-past-irrealis, and today-past-continuous (Waters 1983).  Additionally many verb stems contain a noun related to the definition of a verb; for example:  – 'work' n. and  – 'work', v. (Waters 1983).  Customarily, dji is added to the noun, which creates the verb stem – in this case, ; the suffix -gi places the verb in either the non-past or future tense.

Verb tenses

(Waters 1983)

Nouns
Nouns follow a similar process to verbs, but while verbs state when or how an action was done, nouns denote subject, object, and possession.  Nouns have different categories, called cases, which specify the function of each noun in a sentence (Shelmerdine 2013).  More specifically the cases mark a noun as either the subject or object.  They also mark implied prepositions like: to, for, from, etc.  An example of an implied preposition is the Djinang word  'camp' –  allative '(to) camp' (Waters 1979).  Furthermore in an Australian language there are three very important grammatical associations that nouns can take: Transitive subject (ergative), intransitive subject (nominative), and the object (accusative) (Koch 2007).  Because word order is variable, these cases are important in building an intelligible utterance.  The chart below lists the different noun cases with their functions and common endings (Waters 1983).

Deictics and interrogatives
An interesting aspect of Djinang is the nominal class of words (deictics and interrogative) (Waters 1983).  Deictics use the same cases as nouns.  They also often convey number (singular/plural) and relative distance like this, here or that, there (Koch 2007).

An example of suffix compounding in the deictic word class:
 'that one' (accusative)
 'that one's' (genitive)
 'that one's' (genitive) (emphatic possessive)

Interrogative particles are quite simply the words that signify an utterance as a question, e.g.  'who',  'when' (Koch 2007).  In Djinang interrogative particles are found at the beginning of an utterance in exactly the same manner as the English language (Waters 1983).

Vocabulary

Indigenous vocabulary
 'be bright'
 'king brown snake'
 'obscure' 
 'peel' 
 'bald' 
 'midday' 
 'short pipe'
 'power'

Loanwords
Loanwords derived from English:
 'safety pin'
 'tobacco'
 'Sunday'
 'Saturday'
 'store (canteen)'
 'crosscut saw'
 'cattle station'
 'mission'

Endangerment

Materials
There is very little written about the Djinang language or its people.  The majority of all papers written on Djinang were all written by the same author, Bruce E. Waters.  
 "A Distinctive Features Approach to Djinang Phonology and Verb Morphology" (1979)
"Djinang and Djinba: a grammatical and historical perspective" (1983)
"A Grammar of Djinang" (1984)
"Djinang and Djinba: a grammatical and historical perspective" (1989)

Anthropologist Ad Borsboom worked with the Djinang in the 1970s and has published papers about the Marrajiri ritual and song repertoire.

Borsboom, A. P. (1978). Maradjiri. A Modern Ritual Complex in Arnhem Land, Northern Australia. Nijmegen: Katholieke Universitiet.
Borsboom, A. P. (1986). The Cultural Dimension of Change: An Australian Example. Anthropos, 81(4/6), 605-615. ',

Anthropologist Craig Elliott lived and worked with Djinang/Wurlaki people in the late 1980s and has also written about local cosmology and songs. His work contains much linguistic information.

Elliott, C. (1991). 'Mewal is Merri's name' : form and ambiguity in Marrangu cosmology, North Central Arnhem Land. (Master of Arts Thesis), Australian National University, Canberra. Retrieved from http://hdl.handle.net/1885/10349  
Elliott, C. (2015). Conceptual Dynamism and Ambiguity in Marrangu Djinang Cosmology, North-Central Arnhem Land. In P. G. Toner (Ed.), Strings of Connectedness: essays in honour of Ian Keen (pp. 101-117). Canberra: Australian National University.

Djinang teaching staff, assistant teachers and literacy workers in Maningrida and Ramingining continue to produce literacy materials for use in their schools and for a local community audience.
As part of the Maningrida Dictionary project in 1998–2001, linguist Anita Berghout and Wurlaki woman KB (now deceased) worked together on preparing a Djinang and Wurlaki dictionary and learner's guide (still unpublished).

Vitality
Although having a population of around ̴ 220 and no presence in modern medium (T.V., radio, text, etc.), Ethnologue designates Djinang as being 6a (Vigorous); which is a language that is used for "face-to-face communication by all generations" and is sustainable (Lewis, Simons, Fennig 2013).

The reasons for Djinang's robustness begin with where Djinang is located in Australia; Arnhem Land, which is the home of the entire Yolngu language family.  It was declared an Aboriginal Reserve in 1931 (Waters 1979).  It is a place that is still very much steeped in the traditional Aboriginal ways.  It is a large secluded area that is considered by many people to be the least spoiled in the entire world.  It is a place that is inaccessible to most people and forms of transportation. Because the majority of the Djinang people live similarly to how their ancestors did, their practices of exogamy and multilingualism are still in practice (Harvey 2011).

Moreover, the Djinang treasure and value their language very much.  It can be seen in their sacred songs and with how they handle their children's language. Because of exogamy, a child will have a father with one language and a mother with another language resulting in the child learning to speak both of his parents’ languages equally; thus inter-generational transference is very strong (Harvey 2011).

The way of life both helps and hinders the growth of their language.  Because of their semi-nomadic, semi-reclusive nature, large clans are not easily supported.  However, on the other hand it is their close association with their traditional ways that ensures the transfer of language and culture from one generation to the next.

Language revival
, "Djinang/Wurlaki" is listed as one of 20 languages prioritised as part of the Priority Languages Support Project, being undertaken by First Languages Australia and funded by the Department of Communications and the Arts. The project aims to "identify and document critically-endangered languages – those languages for which little or no documentation exists, where no recordings have previously been made, but where there are living speakers".

Sources
Capell, A. (1979) "The History of Australian Languages: a First Approach", in S.A. Wurm (Ed.), Australian Linguistic Studies (pp. 419–619).
Endangered Languages. 2012. The Linguist List at Eastern Michigan University and The University of Hawaii at Manoa. http://www.endangeredlanguages.com  
Harvey, Mark (2011). "Lexical change in pre-colonial Australia"*. Diachronica 28:3 pp. 345–381. DOI: 10.1075/dia.28.3.03har
Keen, Ian (1995). Metaphor and the Metalanguage: "groups" in Northeast Arnhem Land. American Ethnologist, 22:3 pp. 502–527.  Retrieved from https://www.jstor.org/stable/645969
Koch, Harold (2007). An overview of Australian traditional languages. Trends in Linguistics, Studies and Monographs: The habitat of Australia's Aboriginal Languages: Past, Present and Future.  pp. 23–56.  Retrieved from http://site.ebrary.com/id/10197204?ppg=33 
Lewis, M. Paul, Gary F. Simons, and Charles D. Fennig (eds.). 2013. Ethnologue: Languages of the World, Seventeenth edition. Dallas, Texas: SIL International. Online version: http://www.ethnologue.com.
Ian Maddieson (2013). Consonant-Vowel Ratio. In: Dryer, Matthew S. & Haspelmath, Martin (eds.) The World Atlas of Language Structures Online. Leipzig: Max Planck Institute for Evolutionary Anthropology. Retrieved from http://wals.info/chapter/3
Ian Maddieson (2013). Syllable Structure. In: Dryer, Matthew S. & Haspelmath, Martin (eds.) The World Atlas of Language Structures Online. Leipzig: Max Planck Institute for Evolutionary Anthropology. Retrieved from http://wals.info/chapter/12
Shelmerdine, Susan C. (2013). Introduction to Latin second edition. Newburyport, Massachusetts
Waters, Bruce (1979). A Distinctive Features Approach to Djinang Phonology and Verb Morphology. Work Papers of SIL-AAB, A:4. Darwin.
Waters, Bruce (1989). Djinang and Djinba: a grammatical and historical perspective. Pacific Linguistics C 114, Australian National University, Canberra.

In-line citations

Yolŋu languages
Endangered indigenous Australian languages in the Northern Territory